Al Murray's Happy Hour is a television chat show presented by comedian Al Murray and produced by Avalon TV. The first series aired in early 2007 and contained stand-up, guest interviews and live music. The episodes ended with Murray performing a Queen song with the musical guest.

Layout of each episode
The programme has a large studio audience, and at the start of the show, Al interacts with them, talking to some of them in the front row, and usually remarking that they have "beautiful British names", even if the name is clearly not British (such as "Dominique" or "Ming Ming"). He often points out any celebrities in the audience, such as Vanessa Feltz and Uri Geller, and the members of the 'Pub of the Week'.

Around this time, Al points out a regular audience member on the show by the name of "Big Bob". Bob has his very own song which is chanted along the lines of: 'Big Bob, Big Bob, Big Bob'. Right at the end of the song, Al says, " and his wife Anne", who is considerably smaller than her husband. Big Bob's full name is Bob Carlisle and he is a printer from Nottinghamshire who first got involved with the show after winning tickets to a performance in a radio show competition. Al also makes a passing joke about Big Bob's weight, usually sending up excuses other overweight people use. Examples include Al Murray saying "It's a slow metabolism, isn't it, Bob? And a very fast pie arm", "It's a weight problem; you can't wait for lunch", or "It's big bones, isn't it, Bob? Yeah – big bones covered in fat". At the start of series three, Al launched a campaign to get Big Bob on I'm a Celebrity... Get Me out of Here!

He will then give a speech about the greatness of Britain. During this segment, Al will say something along the lines of 'You see, Britain is all about rules. If we had no rules where would we be?' The audience then shouts out 'France!' 'If we had too many rules where would we be?' 'Germany!' For the third time of enquiry it usually features another country, For example: 'If we had rules forcing you to take a nap in the afternoon where would we be? Spain.' – or 'If we had rules forcing us to eat raw fish where would we be? Japan.' He then moves on to say that Queen is the greatest rock band on the planet, before announcing he hasn't got Queen (apart from at the end of series 2), but has a different band instead, and reveals "who's in the loos".

After his speech, there is a commercial break, before interviewing the three guests. In the middle of the interviews, before a commercial break, the musical guest will often sing one of their own songs. Often when a female guest comes on, his friend 'Gary' phones him up (or vice versa), or makes contact in a variety of ways, and asks the guest to say filthy, then Al tells Gary he owes him £12.
At various times during each episode, he will ask the guest about their work. At any moment there is a reference to their earnings, you will hear the "keerrrrrching" of a till. Also, there is a reference to his ex-wife and his faithful dog Ramrod (who is now dead, and comes into the show on wheels.) Sometimes, when guests come on, e.g. when Jason Gardiner from Dancing on Ice came on, he talked about the musical Cats, which he had starred in, and Al made Ramrod's eyes glow red and growl.

At the end of each episode, after the interviews, he will join the musical guest in singing a Queen song. In the final episode of the first series, this was the cast of the musical about Queen – "We Will Rock You", during which the band Queen made an appearance and did a special performance. Every episode ends with Murray saying "please take your glasses back to the bar".

Throughout interviews in the second series, Murray acknowledges the stereotypical leading questions used by chatshow hosts to allow their guests to 'plug' their product or latest project by referring to these types of question as 'blah blah'.

In an interview with Channel 4's Richard & Judy in January 2007, Al Murray revealed that he rehearses celebrity interviews, with members of the staff taking the role as the celebrity guest, who answer the questions hopefully in the same manner as the guests will answer them. This gives Al a bit of help with regards to how to approach each interview, and how he can gain comedy moments from each interview.

Home release
The first series of Happy Hour was released on Region 2 DVD on 6 October 2008. The second series was released on 16 March 2009.

References

External links

2000s British comedy television series
2007 British television series debuts
2008 British television series endings
British television talk shows
ITV comedy
Television series by ITV Studios